Diesel Loco Shed, Ernakulam is a motive power depot performing locomotive maintenance and repair facility for diesel locomotives of the Indian Railways, located at  (ERS) of the Southern Railway zone in the city of Kochi, Kerala. It is one of the four diesel loco sheds of the Southern Railway, the others being at Tondiarpet (TNP) at Chennai, Erode (ED) and Golden Rock (GOC) at Trichy and the only locomotive shed in Kerala and the southernmost loco shed in India. Although it is in Kerala, its locomotives are used mostly in Goa and Maharashtra, and very rarely near the shed for passenger trains.

History 
After Southern Railway set a deadline to eliminate all steam locomotive operations by 1985, a push was given towards establishing diesel as the primary motive power, and the Ernakulam Diesel locomotive shed was established in the year 1981 to meet these ends and the needs of exponentially increasing rail traffic on the new continuous broad-gauge lines from Trivandrum to Mangalore and Palakkad with the completion of gauge conversion of the Ernakulam – Kottayam – Kayamkulam line. The steam sheds at SRR and QLN were subsequently decommissioned.

Initially, the shed handed only WDM-2 and WDS6 class locomotives, but gradually were allocated WDM3As, WDG3As and for a short time, was the only loco shed in the country to have WDM7 locomotives allocated to its roster. The first loco to be homed at ERS was a WDS6 with road number #36012. The last WDM-2 (18701) was removed from service in June 2019 after being in the shed for 38 years. The shed received its First HHP loco WDP-4D(40114) from GOC in December 2019.

Operations 
Like all locomotive sheds, ERS does regular maintenance, overhaul and repair including painting and washing of locomotives. It not only attends to locomotives housed at ERS but to ones coming in from other sheds as well. It has four pit lines for loco repair.

Locomotives of Ernakulam DLS along with Erode and Golden Rock DLS were the regular links for all trains running through Kerala until around the year 2000 when widespread electrification of railway lines started in Kerala. Until then it handled prestigious trains like the double-headed Kerala Express and the Trivandrum Rajdhani Express. ERS locomotives used to be predominantly the regular links for trains traveling on the Konkan Railway as well. As more and more railway lines in Kerala were electrified, ERS started losing links to electric locomotives, mainly WAP-1, WAP-4, WAG-7 and WAP-7 locomotives from the Erode (ED), Arakkonam (AJJ) and Royapuram (RPM) electric locomotive sheds. Ironically, the Thiruvananthapuram railway division in which ERS is located has 100% electrified lines.

Despite all the electrification across the country, ERS locomotives still take trains as far as Gujarat, Bikaner and in the Shornur–Nilambur line of Kerala. The Ernakulam–Okha Express runs with two ERS locomotives in multiple unit operation. The 12201/12202 LTT–Kochuveli Garib Rath is the only ERS link running south of Ernakulam. A prestigious link for ERS was the Dadar–Madgaon Jan Shatabdi Express which was regularly hauled by an ERS WDM-3A for a long time.

Livery and markings 
Indian Railways allows diesel loco sheds to paint their locomotives in their own unique liveries. Ernakulam's locomotives have their current livery scheme as painted in orange with a wide cream band around the middle, with orange lines on the top and bottom, to match with the erstwhile Rajdhani livery. The livery was introduced to match that of the Trivandrum Rajdhani when it was introduced sometime in 1997 as ERS considered the Rajdhani its most prestigious link. The cream bar and the orange line taper downwards at both ends of the locomotive to create a "V" shaped design. This orange–cream–orange color scheme gives the locomotives a cheerful and pleasant look. One locomotive, WDM-3A #16666 was for a short time painted in an experimental light green–cream–light green scheme. Originally, the livery scheme of the Ernakulam shed was yellow at the top and spinach-green at the bottom.

Closure controversy 
In October 2013, Southern Railways submitted a proposal to the railway board to shut down the Ernakulam DLS and convert it into an electric loco shed. Employees at the loco shed, later joined in by the public and people's representatives protested against this decision, alleging a plan to move the shed to Mangalore, demanding the ELS should be established without closing the DLS as it was the only major railway establishment in Kerala. After protests got much popular support, Southern Railway backed down from its move to close the shed.

Electrification of Shed 

Electrification work started at Ernakulam Diesel Shed in 21st January 2021.Work Completed in November 2021 and E loco Trial completed 31st December 2021.ERODE 22008 WAP1 Used For E loco Trial run. From 22 jan 2022 onwards, it has been converted into electric loco shed and all diesel locos are planed to Golden Rock Diesel Loco Shed.

Locomotives

See also 
Electric Loco Shed, Arakkonam
Electric Loco Shed, Erode
Electric Loco Shed, Royapuram
Diesel Loco Shed, Erode
Diesel Loco Shed, Golden Rock
Diesel Loco Shed, Tondiarpet

References

External links 

ERNAKULAM
Transport in Ernakulam district
Thiruvananthapuram railway division
1981 establishments in Kerala